New Ideal Public School (informally known as NIPS) is a private co-educational school situated in the district of Mathura in the state of Uttar Pradesh, India. This school is from nursery up to 8th standard.

Location 
It is situated in the suburban area of the city of
Mathura. 2 km into the city from NH2 and 500m from Mathura Junction railway station

History 
It was established in 1983 by Mr. O.P. Gupta who also serves as its director. In beginning it used to be a primary school but later on it turned into a fully functioning school from Nursery to 12th standard

Organisation and functions
The NIPS institution is a combination of two schools, one is New Ideal Public School for senior students and other is NIP Kinder Garten which is a preschool. Both have a combined strength of over 1200 students.

Other functions
The school also provides education for the students who are preparing for the board examination of high school & intermediate.

Education system
The school is affiliated to Uttar Pradesh Madhyamik Shiksha Parishad and do continuous tests & assignments. It has 3 semesters per year. There are 3 types of exams held per year that are Quarterly Examination, Half Yearly Examination and Annual Examination each for 1 semester. The complete session starts from early April and lasts up to Mid-March next year.

References

External links
 

Private schools in Uttar Pradesh
Primary schools in Uttar Pradesh
High schools and secondary schools in Uttar Pradesh
Education in Mathura
Educational institutions established in 2005
2005 establishments in Uttar Pradesh